The Arthur Williams Homestead, Feed storage Shed is a historic farm outbuilding on Farwell Road, on the outskirts of Bradford, Arkansas.  It is a -story structure, with a gable-roofed box frame structure at its center, flanked by frame shed-roof sections.  The central portion was built c. 1915 as a residence, and about 1930 it was converted for use as a feed shed, with the shed additions added at that time.  It is locally distinctive for the style of box frame construction in the central section, which is not commonly found in White County.

The building was listed on the National Register of Historic Places in 1992.

See also
National Register of Historic Places listings in White County, Arkansas

References

Agricultural buildings and structures on the National Register of Historic Places in Arkansas
National Register of Historic Places in White County, Arkansas
Houses completed in 1915
Buildings and structures completed in 1930
1930 establishments in Arkansas
Houses in White County, Arkansas